Noah C. McFarland (April 23, 1822 – April 26, 1897) was a state senator in multiple U.S. states and was Commissioner of the federal General Land Office from 1881 to 1885.

Biography
Noah C. McFarland was born in Washington County, Pennsylvania in 1822.  He attended Washington College as a member of the class of 1844, but did not graduate.  He moved to Bucyrus, Ohio in 1846, studied law, and was admitted to the bar. He moved to Hamilton, Ohio and practiced law; his house in Hamilton is still standing and has been named a historic site.

McFarland was elected to the Ohio State Senate in 1865. He then moved to Topeka, Kansas in 1870. He was elected to the Kansas State Senate, and was twice appointed a regent of the University of Kansas.

In 1881, McFarland was appointed Commissioner of the General Land Office, and served until 1885.

McFarland died at the Copeland Hotel, Topeka, Kansas on April 26, 1897.

References

1822 births
Date of death unknown
People from Washington County, Pennsylvania
Politicians from Hamilton, Ohio
Politicians from Topeka, Kansas
Ohio state senators
Republican Party Kansas state senators
Ohio lawyers
Washington & Jefferson College alumni
General Land Office Commissioners
1897 deaths
19th-century American politicians
People from Bucyrus, Ohio
19th-century American lawyers